Cassandra Castro Holland (born c. 1984) is a Puerto Rican beauty pageant titleholder. Holland represented Fajardo at the Miss Puerto Rico Universe 2004 pageant, where she placed third runner-up. Holland later became Miss World Puerto Rico 2004.

References

1980s births
Miss World 2004 delegates
Puerto Rican beauty pageant winners
Living people